Christians in Singapore constitute 18.9% of the country's population. In 2020, about 37.1% of the country's Christians identified as Catholic and 62.9% as 'Other Christians' (chiefly Protestants).

Christianity was introduced to Singapore by Anglicans among the first British settlers to arrive shortly after the founding of modern Singapore by Stamford Raffles. The percentage of Christians in Singapore increased from 12.7% in 1990 to 14.6% in 2000. Whilst the 2015 census showed the Christian population increased again, to 18.8%. Christianity has flourished in post-colonial Singapore, and a growing number of Singaporeans are converting to Christianity, Christian converts tend to come from the young, well-educated, higher-income brackets, and English-speaking Chinese generation.

The majority of Christian churches are under the umbrella of the National Council of Churches of Singapore. Most belong to Protestant traditions which consist of an array of denominations. Another major umbrella group is APCCS (Alliance of Pentecostal & Charismatic Churches Singapore) is a network of local churches, Christian organisations and pastors from largely independent charismatic churches and the Assemblies of God denomination.

Protestantism
Local Protestant denominations consist of: Anglicans, Methodists, Pentecostals, Baptists, Reformed (mostly Presbyterians and Dutch Reformed),  and Lutherans. There are also nondenominational churches from the Churches of Christ, Plymouth Brethren, Charismatic Christian and Evangelical Free Church traditions.

Anglicanism is represented in Singapore by the Diocese of Singapore, which has 26 parishes in Singapore, and is a part of the Church of the Province of South East Asia.

The Methodist Church in Singapore is the largest mainline Protestant denomination in the country, with some 42,000 members in 46 churches.

Pentecostalism has exerted a larger influence with the start of the charismatic movement in the 1970s. There are other organisations such as, Fei Yue Family Centres, Teen Challenge various community hospitals, and Beulah.

Prominent megachurches include New Creation Church, City Harvest Church and Faith Community Baptist Church, which count among Singapore's 10 largest charities, according to a report by The Straits Times in 2019.

The City Harvest Church Criminal Breach of Trust Case involves the misappropriation of S$50.6 million in church funds by church founder Kong Hee and five other key leaders in the church. It is the largest case of its kind in the history of Singapore.

Catholicism

Roman Catholicism 

The Roman Catholic population in Singapore generally consists of Chinese (including Peranakans) and Indians, along with a few smaller minority groups such as Eurasians (including Kristang), white Europeans and Filipinos. The Chinese, the majority ethnicity in Singapore, also account for the majority of Catholics. There are 32 Roman Catholic parishes in Singapore, each administering to a particular district in Singapore.

Singapore has a Roman Catholic Archdiocese headed by Archbishop William Cardinal Goh who presides at the Cathedral of the Good Shepherd. The Holy Mass in Singapore is celebrated in numerous vernacular tongues, including English, Cantonese, Mandarin, Malayalam, Hokkien, Teochew, Korean, German, Indonesian, Tamil and Tagalog (at the Cathedral of the Good Shepherd). The Traditional Latin Mass is also celebrated every Sunday at 2pm at St. Joseph's Church (Victoria Street).

Peranakan Roman Catholics are generally concentrated in the Church of the Holy Family in Katong; whilst St. Joseph's Church along Victoria street is a cultural base for Portuguese Eurasians. Roman Catholic parishes in the 18th to early 19th centuries were initially set up along racial and cultural lines by various Roman Catholic missionary groups from Europe.

Various Roman Catholic parishes in Singapore are actively involved in social services such as welfare homes, the opening of soup kitchens as well as missionary trips to places like Indonesia and the Philippines. There is also the Catholic Medical Guild, and other Roman Catholic lobby groups that are based in the Church of St Peter & Paul parish grounds. They are also currently supporting the creation of Neighbourhood Christian Communities (NCC) in order to organise and gather the Roman Catholic communities within their neighbourhoods.

Eastern Catholicism 
A fledgling Greek-Catholic community, dependent on the Ukrainian Greek-Catholic bishop of Melbourne, is also present.

A Syro-Malabar Catholic community in Singapore has been set up to cater to the growing Malayali diaspora. The Qurbana is celebrated at the Church of the Transfiguration in Punggol.

Oriental Orthodoxy 

Oriental Orthodox churches in Singapore include the old Armenian Church which has a church building and newly appointed resident clergy. By the Pontifical Order of Karekin II, Supreme Patriarch and Catholicos of All Armenians, Zaven Yazichyan, a member of the Brotherhood of Holy Etchmiadzin; has been appointed to serve as the spiritual pastor of Singapore, the Coptic Orthodox Church which meets in the Armenian Church, and the Syriac Orthodox Church; the latter two churches generally minister to the Coptic and Indian communities respectively.

There is also a large Malankara Orthodox presence in Singapore administering to the Keralite Diaspora, with services as St. Thomas Orthodox Syrian Cathedral.

Eastern Orthodoxy 

In Singapore there is also a small but growing Eastern Orthodox congregation made up of ethnic Greeks, Georgians, Russians, Ukrainians and Indians, constituting a small minority in the local Christian population. In 2008, the Holy Synod of the Ecumenical Patriarchate of Constantinople decided to create Eastern Orthodox Metropolitanate of Singapore and South Asia, with jurisdiction over Singapore, Indonesia, Malaysia, Brunei, Timor, Maldives, Sri Lanka, Bangladesh, India, Nepal, Bhutan, Pakistan and Afghanistan. First Diocesan Bishop was appointed in 2011, when Holy Synod of the Ecumenical Patriarchate elected Archimandrite Konstantinos (Tsilis) as the first Metropolitan of Singapore and South Asia. He was ordained by Ecumenical Patriarch Bartholomew I of Constantinople and resides in Singapore. The central parish in Singapore is served by Archimandrite Daniel Toyne.

On 28 December 2018, in response to the Ecumenical Patriarchate's actions in Ukraine, the Holy Synod of the Russian Orthodox Church decided to create "a Patriarchal Exarchate in Western Europe with the center in Paris", as well as "a Patriarchal Exarchate in South-East Asia [PESEA] with the center in Singapore." The "sphere of pastoral responsibility" of the PESEA is Singapore, Vietnam, Indonesia, Cambodia, North Korea, South Korea, Laos, Malaysia, the Myanmar, the Philippines, and Thailand.

Nontrinitarianism
There are also various nontrinitarian congregations in Singapore, such as the Church of Jesus Christ of Latter-day Saints and the True Jesus Church. Other groups have been subject to varying degrees of restriction, most notably Jehovah's Witnesses and the Unification Church.

Education and schools
A Pew Center study about religion and education around the world in 2016, found that between the various Christian communities, Singapore outranks other nations in terms of Christians who obtain a university degree in institutions of higher education (67%).

Anglican schools
Anglican High School
Christ Church Secondary School
Saint Andrew's Junior School
Saint Andrew's Secondary School
Saint Andrew's Junior College
Saint Hilda's Primary School
Saint Hilda's Secondary School
Saint Margaret's Primary School
Saint Margaret's Secondary School

Methodist schools
Anglo-Chinese School (Junior)
Anglo-Chinese School (Primary)
Anglo-Chinese School (Barker Road)
Anglo-Chinese School (Independent)
Anglo-Chinese Junior College
Anglo-Chinese School (International)
Fairfield Methodist Primary School
Fairfield Methodist Secondary School
Geylang Methodist Primary School
Geylang Methodist Secondary School
Methodist Girls' School
Paya Lebar Methodist Girls' School (Primary)
Paya Lebar Methodist Girls' School (Secondary)

Presbyterian schools
Kuo Chuan Presbyterian Primary School
Kuo Chuan Presbyterian Secondary School
Pei Hwa Presbyterian Primary School
Presbyterian High School

Roman Catholic schools
Assumption English School
Assumption Pathway School
Canossa Catholic Primary School
Canossian Convent Kindergarten
Canossian School for the Hearing-Impaired
Catholic High School
Catholic Junior College
Catholic Kindergarten
CHIJ Katong (Primary)
CHIJ Katong Convent
CHIJ Kellock Primary
CHIJ Our Lady of Good Counsel
CHIJ Our Lady Queen of Peace
CHIJ Our Lady of the Nativity
CHIJ Primary (Toa Payoh)
CHIJ Saint Nicholas Girls' School
CHIJ Saint Joseph's Convent
CHIJ Saint Theresa's Convent
CHIJ Secondary School (Toa Payoh)
De La Salle School
Good Shepherd Kindergarten
Hai Sing Catholic School
Holy Innocents' High School
Holy Innocents' Primary School
Magdalene's Kindergarten
Maris Stella Kindergarten
Maris Stella High School
Marymount Convent School
Montfort Junior School
Montfort Secondary School
Nazareth Centre Kindergarten
St Anthony's Canossian Primary School
St Anthony's Canossian Secondary School
St Anthony's Primary School
St Gabriel's Primary School
St Gabriel's Secondary School
Saint Joseph's Institution
Saint Joseph's Institution Junior
Saint Joseph's Institution International School
Saint Patrick's School

Inter-faith
Singapore is a society of diverse religious traditions. The Declaration of Religious Harmony, which was published in 2003, is a seminal document, which the National Council of Churches of Singapore supported and helped create. On 3 September 2008, the sociologist and Pentecostal pastor, Mathew Mathews, who was named a visiting fellow of the Sociology department at the National University of Singapore, interviewed 183 Singaporean clergy. From these interviews he formed the opinion that the Christian clergy in many parts of Singapore were wary of inter-faith dialogue. He claimed that nearly 50% of clergy believe that inter-faith dialogue compromises their own religious convictions. He presented his paper to the Institute of Public Studies (Singapore) in a forum they organised on 2 September 2008.

See also

Religion in Singapore

References

External links

Antioch.com.sg: Partial directory of non-Roman Catholic churches in Singapore
Singapore Christian Web
Veritas (official website of the Roman Catholic Archdiocese of Singapore): Singapore Catholic church directory
Archdiocese of Singapore